Tonny Brochmann Christiansen (born 11 August 1989) is a Danish footballer who plays as a midfielder. He has previously played for Horsens, Sogndal, Sandnes Ulf, Jerv, Stabæk and Mjøndalen.

Career

AC Horsens
Brochmann was born in Horsens and he started his career with Horsens in 2009.

Sogndal Fotball
Brochmann joined Sogndal in 2011. He made his debut for Sogndal in a 1-1 draw against Vålerenga.

Sandnes Ulf

FK Jerv
Brochmann joined Jerv on 1 March 2016. He went on to score in his OBOS-ligaen debut when Jerv defeated Ranheim 2-1 at home stadium Levermyr on 3 April 2016.

Stabæk
Before the 2017 season Brochmann signed for Stabæk.

Mjøndalen
On the last day of the transfer window Brochmann signed for Mjøndalen.

Career statistics

Club

References

External links
 

1989 births
Living people
Danish men's footballers
People from Horsens
AC Horsens players
Sogndal Fotball players
Eliteserien players
Sandnes Ulf players
FK Jerv players
Stabæk Fotball players
Mjøndalen IF players
FC Fredericia players
Norwegian First Division players
Danish expatriate men's footballers
Expatriate footballers in Norway
Danish expatriate sportspeople in Norway
Association football midfielders
Sportspeople from the Central Denmark Region